Michael David Barrios Puerta (born 21 April 1991) is a Colombian professional footballer who plays as a winger for Major League Soccer club Colorado Rapids.

Club career
Barrios spent four seasons with Colombian Categoría Primera A side Uniautónoma before signing with Major League Soccer club FC Dallas on 19 February 2015. During the 2018 season, Barrios scored a hat-trick for Dallas to defeat Sporting Kansas City.

On 13 January 2021, after six seasons with Dallas, Barrios was traded to Colorado Rapids. Barrios left Dallas as the club's second all-time leader in combined goals and assists with 75. He finished in the top-5 in MLS in assists in 2017 and 2019 and is one of just five MLS players to register 30 goals and 40 assists since 2015.

Career statistics

Club

Honors and awards 

FC Dallas
 Lamar Hunt U.S. Open Cup: 2016
 Supporters' Shield: 2016

References

External links
 

1991 births
Living people
Colombian footballers
Colombian expatriate footballers
Uniautónoma F.C. footballers
FC Dallas players
Colorado Rapids players
Colorado Rapids 2 players
Expatriate soccer players in the United States
Major League Soccer players
MLS Next Pro players
Colombian expatriate sportspeople in the United States
Footballers from Barranquilla
Association football wingers